Bohol local elections was held last May 13, 2019 as part of the 2019 Philippine general election. Registered voters elected leaders for local positions: a city or town mayor, vice mayor and town councilors, as well as three to four members of the Sangguniang Panlalawigan, the vice-governor, governor and  three representatives for the three districts of Bohol.

There is a 12.51% increase to the number of registered voters for the whole province by the end of COMELEC's nationwide registration deadline last September 28, 2018. This is equivalent to 99,914 new registered voters from 798,768 last 2016 election to a total of 898,682 for this election, becoming the 19th vote-rich province of the country.

At the end of the filing of certificates of candidacy last October 17, 2018, 46 hopefuls have filed their certificates of candidacy (COC) for 15 provincial elective positions. Based on the official list of provincial Commission on Elections, 5 aspirants ran for governor, 2 for vice-governors, 31 for provincial board members, and 8 for congressmen in three districts.

On May 16, 2019, Arthur C. Yap was proclaimed as the new governor of the province by the provincial board of canvassers edging a narrow margin from former cabinet secretary Leoncio Evasco.

Provincial Election

Governor
Edgar Chatto is the incumbent but term-limited. He decided to regain his former post as representative of 1st District under Padayaon Bohol banner and was reinstated. Incumbent  3rd district congressman Arthur C. Yap is the official nominee of the ruling coalition. His major contender is the former Maribojoc mayor and Cabinet Secretary Leoncio Evasco Jr.

Vice-Governor
Dionisio D. Balite is the incumbent but chose to run for representative of the 3rd district.

Sangguniang Panlalawigan

1st District
Electorate (2019):  291,593
Parties are as stated in their certificates of candidacy.

|bgcolor=black colspan=5|

2nd District
Electorate (2019):  281,949
Parties are as stated in their certificates of candidacy. 

|bgcolor=black colspan=5|

3rd District
Electorate (2019):  304,044
Parties are as stated in their certificates of candidacy. 

|bgcolor=black colspan=5|

Congressional Election Candidates

1st District, Congressman
City: Tagbilaran City
Municipality: Alburquerque, Antequera, Baclayon,  Balilihan, Calape, Catigbian, Corella, Cortes, Dauis, Loon, Maribojoc, Panglao, Sikatuna, Tubigon
Population (2010):  415,420

Last termer Rene Relampagos is the incumbent. Incumbent governor Edgar Chatto is the ruling party's official nominee.

 Substituted his son Dan Ismael Lim (NPC)
.

2nd District, Congressman
City: none
Municipality: Bien Unido, Buenavista, Clarin, Dagohoy, Danao, Getafe, Inabanga, Pres. Carlos P. Garcia, Sagbayan, San Isidro, San Miguel, Talibon, Trinidad, Ubay
Population (2010):  415,878

Erico Aristotle Aumentado is the incumbent.

3rd District, Congressman
City: none
Municipality: Alicia, Anda, Batuan, Bilar, Candijay, Carmen, Dimiao, Duero, Garcia Hernandez, Guindulman, Jagna, Lila, Loay, Loboc, Mabini, Pilar, Sevilla, Sierra Bullones, Valencia
Population (2010):  423,830
Last termer Arthur Yap is the incumbent and term-limited. Instead, he ran for governor and won. Judge Carlos Fernando was the ruling party's official nominee. Former neophyte board member Kristine Alexie Besas-Tutor became the first congresswoman ever elected in Bohol's 3rd District and the second congresswoman elected in the province after Venice Borja-Agana.

City and Municipal Election
All municipalities of Bohol and Tagbilaran City elected mayor, vice-mayor and councilors this election. The mayor and vice mayor with the highest number of votes win the seat; they are voted separately, therefore, they may be of different parties when elected. Below is the list of Mayoral and vice-Mayoral candidates of each city  and municipalities in three districts.

First District
Parties are as stated in their certificates of candidacy.

Tagbilaran City
Electorate (2019):  59,949
John Geesnell Yap and Jose Antonio Veloso are the incumbent mayor and vice-mayor.

 Substituted Lino Karaan (NPC)
 Replaced Ma. Ann Balabag (NPC).

Alburquerque
Electorate (2019): 7,393
Elpren Charles Tungol and Cayetano Doria Jr. are the incumbents.

Antequera
Electorate (2019):  9,725
Incumbents Jose Mario Pahang and Simon Leo Jadulco just exchanged on the positions they ran with.

Baclayon
Electorate (2019): 13,774
Benecio Uy and Romulo Balangkig are the incumbents.

Balilihan
Electorate (2019): 13,480
Incumbent Pureza Veloso-Chatto and Adonis Roy Olalo are the incumbents.

Calape
Electorate (2019): 22,474
Brothers Nelson Yu and Sulpicio Yu Jr. are the incumbents.

Catigbian
Electorate (2019): 15,603
Incumbent mayor Virgilio Lurot did not run for reelection, paving a way for former mayor Roberto Salinas to regain his post. Meanwhile, vice-mayor Necita Napiñas-Digaum vied for reelection.

Corella
Incumbent Jose Nicanor Tocmo is the incumbent mayor but term-limited. He ran for Provincial board member instead. Incumbent vice-mayor Ma. Asuncion Banal-Daquio vied for reelection unopposed. 
Electorate (2019): 5,725

Cortes
Electorate (2019): 11,689
Lynn Iven Paña-Lim and Leo Pabutoy are the incumbents.

Dauis
Electorate (2019): 29,490
Marietta Tocmo-Sumaylo and Luciano Bongalos are the incumbent mayor and vice-mayor, all ran for reelection and won.

Loon
Electorate (2019): 27,676
Elvi Peter Relampagos and Lloyd Peter Lopez are the incumbents and were reelected.

Maribojoc
Electorate (2019): 14,194
Gumersindo Arocha and Jose Veloso are the incumbents.

Panglao
Electorate (2019): 24,223
Leonila Paredes-Montero and Pedro Fuertes are the incumbents.

Sikatuna
Electorate (2019): 5,123
Incumbents Jose Ellorimo Jr. and Julian Manigo are term-limited. The ruling party nominated new candidates.

Tubigon
Electorate (2019): 31,075
William Richard Jao is the incumbent mayor. However incumbent vice-mayor Virgilio Fortich is term limited, have already served for 3 consecutive terms.

Second District
Parties are as stated in their certificates of candidacy.

Bien Unido
Electorate (2019): 18,170
Elected vice-mayor Rene Borenaga replaced mayor Gisela Bendong-Boniel after the latter's tragic death. Borenaga ran for full-term as mayor and won. Incumbent vice-mayor Ramon Arcenal also got his full-term.

Buenavista
Electorate (2019): 19,907
Mayor Ronald Lowell Tirol died while in office. His successor incumbent vice-mayor Dave Duallo ran for full term as mayor and won. Ma. Christine Cabarrubias-Torregosa ran for vice-mayor unopposed.

Clarin
Electorate (2019): 15,338
Allen Ray Piezas is the incumbent but term limited. He decided to run for vice-mayor instead and won. Meanwhile, incumbent vice-mayor Velden Aparicio is term-limited.

Dagohoy
Electorate (2019): 12,754
Sofronio Apat and Ma. Shirley Abulag-Amodia are the incumbents and won.

Danao
Electorate (2019): 13,547
Natividad Gonzaga is the incumbent. Former mayor and current incumbent vice-mayor Jose Cepedoza ran again for town's chief executive and won.

Getafe
Electorate (2019): 20,739
Casey Shaun Camacho and Eduardo Torremocha are the incumbents and were reelected.

 Substituted Rodolfo dela Torre (NUP).
 Substituted Danilo Enghog (NUP).

Inabanga
Electorate (2019): 26,345
Josephine Socorro Ching-Jumamoy and Rodrigo Jumamoy are the incumbents and won.

Pres. Carlos P. Garcia
Electorate (2019): 16,473
Fernando Estavilla and Renato Sente are the incumbents. Estavilla was reelected but not Sente.

Sagbayan
Electorate (2019): 15,999
Ricardo Suarez is the incumbent but term-limited. The ruling party nominated new candidates.

San Isidro
Electorate (2019): 7,152
Incumbent mayor Jacinto Naraga is term-limited. Meanwhile, incumbent vice-mayor Filemon Mantabute ran for reelection and won.

San Miguel
Electorate (2019): 15,952
Incumbent mayor Nunila Mendez-Pinat is not seeking for reelection. On the other hand, incumbent vice-mayor Faustino Bulaga ran for reelection and won.

Talibon
Electorate (2019): 33,211
Incumbent Restituto Auxtero seek for election as Sangguniang Panlalawigan member. Incumbent vice-mayor Cleto Garcia ran for mayor of the town. Janette Aurestila-Garcia became the first female chief executive of the town.

Trinidad
Electorate (2019): 19,017
Incumbents Judith del Rosario-Cajes and Manuel Garcia ran for reelection and won.

Ubay
Electorate (2019): 47,345
Incumbents Constantino Reyes and Nelson Uy seek for reelection. Reyes was reelected but not Uy.

Third District
Parties are as stated in their certificates of candidacy.

Alicia
Electorate (2019): 15,807
Incumbents Marnilou Salas-Ayuban and Victoriano Torres III just exchanged positions they ran with and won.

Anda
Electorate (2019): 13,313
Incumbent Angelina Blanco-Simacio and Nilo Bersabal vied for reelection. Bersabal was reelected.

Batuan
Electorate (2019): 9,556
Incumbents Antonino Jumawid and Precious Joy Dumagan-Baguio ran for reelection and won.

Bilar
Electorate (2019): 12,845
Norman Palacio is the incumbent but term limited. He decided to run as vice-mayor instead. Meanwhile, incumbent vice-mayor Arnold Calamba is term-limited.

Candijay
Electorate (2019): 21,512
Christopher Tutor is the incumbent and won. Unfortunately, former vice-mayor Jesse Sales died while in office.

Carmen
Electorate (2019): 33,270
Incumbents Ricardo Francisco Toribio and Romeo Bigay Jr. are seek for reelection on their respective posts and won.

 Substituted Victor Tesio (PFP).

Dimiao
Electorate (2019): 11,106
Danilo Guivencan is the incumbent but lost. Incumbent vice-mayor Aniceta Calihat-Ucang didn't run for reelection.

Duero
Electorate (2019): 13,695
Incumbent mayor Conrada Castino-Amparo vied against vice-mayor Emma Fe Peligro-Bajade for mayorship of the town. Amparo won and reelected.

Garcia Hernandez
Electorate (2019): 16,374
Incumbents mayor Tita Baja-Gallentes and vice-mayor Lito Dajalos were at one-on-one battle for town chief executive. Gallentes was reelected.

Guindulman
Electorate (2019): 22,878
Albino Balo is the incumbent mayor. Incumbent vice-mayor Ma.Fe Añana-Piezas seek to regain her old position as mayor and was elected.

Jagna
Electorate (2019): 22,666
Incumbents mayor Fortunato Abrenilla and vice-mayor Bonifacio Virtudes Jr. just exchanged positions they are ran to. However, Abrenilla died while in office. His brother, Theodore Abrenilla was named as a replacement candidate and won. 

 Substituted his brother Fortunato (PDP-Laban) who died while in office.

Lila
Electorate (2019): 7,571
Incumbent mayor Regina Cahiles-Salazar and vice-mayor Arturo Piollo II just exchanged positions and won.

Loay
Electorate (2019): 13,073
Incumbent mayor Rochelle Brigitte Imboy-Abutazil moved down to run for vice-mayor while his mother and former mayor Rosemarie Lim-Imboy ran on her place. Both failed on their candidancies, ending 12-year dominance of Imboys since 2007.

Loboc
Electorate (2019): 12,938
Helen Calipusan-Alaba is the incumbent but didn't seek third and final term. Former mayor Leon Calipusan is the ruling party's official nominee and was elected. Meanwhile, incumbent vice-mayor Pablito Sumampong vied for reelection and won.

Mabini
Electorate (2019): 18,738
This was a one-on-one battle between incumbent mayor Juanito Jayoma and vice-mayor Jesha Cuyacot-Toque for the top post of the town. Jayoma was reelected.

 Substituted Romeo Jayoma (PFP).

Pilar
Electorate (2019): 18,454
Incumbents Necitas Tabaranza-Cubrado and Eugenio Datahan II seek for reelection and won.

Sevilla
Electorate (2019): 8,026
Incumbents Juliet Bucag-Dano and Richard Bucag both ran for reelection and won.

Sierra Bullones
Electorate (2019): 15,053
Incumbent mayor Simplicio Maestrado and vice-mayor Rainfredo Buslon vied against each other for town's top executive post. Maestrado was reelected.

Valencia
Electorate (2019): 17,169
Incumbent mayor Maria Katrina Lim seek for reelection unopposed. Her opponent, Jesus Balistoy Jr. withdrew his candidacy last November 29, 2018.

References

External links
COMELEC - Official website of the Philippine Commission on Elections (COMELEC)
NAMFREL - Official website of National Movement for Free Elections (NAMFREL)
PPCRV - Official website of the Parish Pastoral Council for Responsible Voting (PPCRV)

2019 Philippine local elections
 
May 2019 events in the Philippines